Hyflux Ltd (Hyflux) was a sustainable products and research company listed on the Singapore Stock Exchange (SGX).

The company was founded in 1989 by Olivia Lum, Group CEO, President and Managing Director.

In 2006, the company was given the 'Water Company of the Year' award, at the 'Global Water Awards', by the Global Water Intelligence, UK.

The company was placed under judicial management (JM) on 19 November 2020 by the Singapore Courts due to excessive debts. Control of the company's operation has been transferred to the appointed judicial managers Hamish Alexander Christie and Patrick Bance of Borrelli Walsh. The company has been approved to wind up on 21 July 2021.

History

The company started initially as Hydrochem (S) Pte Ltd in 1989 with a start-up capital of S$20,000 and three staff, selling water treatment systems. 

In 2008, the group had net profits of S$59 million. In 2016, the group had net profits of S$3.8 million.

On 21 May 2018, the company suspended its shares and applied for court supervision to reorganise liabilities and businesses the next day.

On 19 October 2018, conglomerate Salim Group and energy giant Medco Group agreed to offer Hyflux a S$400 million equity injection, in exchange for a 60 per cent stake in the company once it has settled all its debts.

On 4 June 2021, judicial managers filed an application with Singapore's court to wind up the company after failed negotiations with an investor.

On 21 July 2021, Singapore's high court has approved for Hyflux to wind up and be liquidated with its judicial managers being its liquidators.

References

Singaporean brands
Singaporean companies established in 1989
Technology companies established in 1989
Singaporean companies disestablished in 2021
2021 disestablishments in Singapore